Arthur Garfield Kennedy (June 29, 1880 − April 21, 1954) was an American philologist who served as Professor of English at Stanford University from 1914 to 1945.

Biography
Kennedy was born in Weeping Water, Nebraska on June 29, 1880, and attended Doane College at Crete, Nebraska. He received his master's degree from the University of Nebraska and his doctor's degree from Stanford University. From 1914 to 1945 Kennedy was Professor of English at Stanford University. He was the author of several books on the English language. In 1925 he, with Kemp Malone and Louise Pound, founded the journal American Speech and he was a frequent contributor. Kennedy died at his home in Palo Alto on April 21, 1954, and was survived by two grown children.

References

External links
 Arthur Garfield Kennedy at Find a Grave
 Guide to the Arthur Garfield Kennedy Papers at the Online Archive of California
 Arthur Garfield Kennedy at the Online Books Page

1880 births
1954 deaths
American philologists
Doane University alumni
People from Cass County, Nebraska
Stanford University alumni
Stanford University faculty
University of Nebraska–Lincoln alumni
20th-century philologists